Michael Madhusudan Memorial College, established in 1996, is a general degree college in Durgapur, in the Paschim Bardhaman district, West Bengal, India. It offers undergraduate courses in Arts, Commerce, Management and Sciences. It is affiliated to  Kazi Nazrul University.

Departments

Science
Mathematics
Computer Science
Microbiology
Information Technology
Physics
Chemistry

Arts and Commerce
Bengali
English
History
Geography
Philosophy
Education
Commerce

See also

References

External links
Michael Madhusudan Memorial College
Kazi Nazrul University
University Grants Commission
National Assessment and Accreditation Council

Universities and colleges in Paschim Bardhaman district
Colleges affiliated to University of Burdwan
Education in Durgapur, West Bengal
Educational institutions established in 1996
1996 establishments in West Bengal